Mascouche (also designated exo5, known during planning as Repentigny–Mascouche) is a commuter railway line in Greater Montreal, Quebec, Canada. It is operated by Exo, the organization that operates public transport services across this region.

Opened on December 1, 2014, by Exo's predecessor agency, the Agence Métropolitaine de transport (AMT), the Montreal region's sixth commuter train line required the construction of 10 new train stations, several civil engineering structures and 13 km of new railway track. This includes some track in the median of the A 640 between Repentigny and Mascouche.

Beginning on May 11, 2020, the Mascouche line was rerouted around the Mount Royal Tunnel, bypassing  and  stations due to the construction of the Réseau express métropolitain (REM). In 2024,  will open as the Mascouche line's new southern terminus, replacing . Riders wishing to reach Central Station must transfer to the REM at Côte-de-Liesse.

Overview
The line was announced as the Repentigny-Mascouche line in a press conference on March 17, 2006, and follows a major campaign by the residents of eastern Montréal and the north-eastern suburbs to restore commuter rail service.

The  line used the Mount Royal Tunnel and Canadian National track from Montreal's Central Station to Repentigny. New track was built from Repentigny to Terrebonne along the Autoroute 640, before turning towards the Trois-Rivières Subdivision of the Chemins de fer Québec-Gatineau at Mascouche. Most of the route, in particular the section after Mont-Royal to Repentigny, follows a similar path to the never-built Line 6 of the Montreal Metro, which was planned as a steel-wheeled "regional metro" line using a somewhat similar alignment. The journey time between Mascouche and downtown Montreal (using the pre-2020 alignment before the closure of Mount Royal Tunnel) was 61 minutes.

Originally estimated at $300 million and expected to open in 2008, the line costed $670 million and opened in 2014. It has 13 stops (10 new, 3 existing) and offers eight departures in each direction per weekday, mainly during rush-hour.

Locomotives
On May 14, 2007, the former Agence métropolitaine de transport (AMT) and New Jersey Transit put out a joint call for tenders to purchase dual-powered locomotives. In Montreal, the locomotives switch to electric power at Mont-Royal (this was originally planned for Ahuntsic) to enter Mount Royal Tunnel to Central Station. This international project is the first of its kind in North America. Twenty locomotives of type ALP-45DP were delivered to the AMT from Bombardier Transportation. They now haul the RTM's 3000-series Bombardier MultiLevel coaches, in groups of 5 or 6 cars.

History
Two former commuter train lines ran along part of the route of the line.

CN Montreal North commuter line
CN operated a commuter service from Central Station to Montreal North from 1946 until November 8, 1968. An electric locomotive and several coaches ran one round trip a day in each direction, in rush hours only. Stations going east along the CN St Laurent Subdivision from Eastern Junction where it meets the Deux-Montagnes line were:

Boulevard, at boulevard St. Laurent, which divides Montreal into East and West
Ahuntsic, site of current Via Rail station
Sault-au-Récollet, near rue d'Iberville
St. Vital, at  boulevard St. Michel
Pie-IX, at boulevard Pie-IX
Ste. Gertrude, at boulevard Ste. Gertrude
Montreal North, at boulevard Lacordaire

Ridership was never very high. Near the end, most remaining passengers preferred to switch to the Sauve Metro station on the Orange Line of the Montreal Metro which opened October 14, 1966. Congestion on that part of the line was one of the reasons the Mascouche line was inaugurated.

Métropolitrain
A temporary service dubbed the "Métropolitrain" was organized by the STCUM from May 15 to October 12, 1990, while Autoroute 40, the boulevard Métropolitain, was being rebuilt. It ran on then-Canadian National track from near the Du Collège metro station to Repentigny with an intermediate station near the Sauvé Metro station. Two trips ran each way in each weekday rush hour. There was no direct service to central Montreal. As there was no existing regional transit coordinator at the time, the line was never very successful.

Stations:
 Ste-Croix and St-Louis (Du College Metro)
 Ahuntsic railway station (Sauvé Metro)
 Saint-Leonard, at boulevard Lacordaire
 Rivière des Prairies
 Pointe-aux-Trembles (Bout-de-l'Île)
 Repentigny

Exo service
The Agence Métropolitaine de transport (AMT) began service on this line on December 1, 2014, after completing construction of 10 new train stations, several civil engineering structures and 13 km of new railway track.

On June 1, 2017, the AMT was dissolved and replaced by two new governing bodies, the Autorité régionale de transport métropolitain (ARTM) and the Réseau de transport métropolitain (RTM). The RTM took over all former AMT services, including this line. In May 2018, the RTM rebranded itself as Exo, and rebranded each line with a number and updated colour. The Mascouche line became Exo 5, and its line colour was updated to a lighter pastel shade of purple.

Since May 11, 2020, the Mascouche line has temporarily terminated at Ahuntsic station (with some trains continuing to Central Station via an alternate route partially using the CN Taschereau intermodal yard to access Central Station) due to the ongoing conversion of the Deux-Montagnes line into the mainline of the Réseau express métropolitain (REM) light rail system. Once the downtown section of the REM is completed sometime in 2024, a new station called  will open, expressly designed to ensure smooth transfer of users between the Mascouche line and the REM, and replacing Ahuntsic station as the line's new terminus.

List of stations
There are 11 current stations on the Mascouche line:

Criticism of route 

Most observers agree that the proposed route from Montreal to Repentigny makes sense for several reasons, including the use of existing infrastructure. The route from Repentigny to Mascouche has been criticized for several reasons, including:

 The need to build (some say unnecessarily) 12 km of track from Repentigny to Mascouche.
 In the Le Gardeur sector of Repentigny, the new track passes very close to a large General Dynamics munitions plant, where explosives are stored and processed. Both GD and Natural Resources Canada, which regulates explosives in Canada, have raised safety and security issues. Exo has built a large canopied shelter wall and berm between tracks and plant.
 The route does not serve cities east of Repentigny, particularly L'Assomption and Joliette. Those cities have bus service to Repentigny.
 Some say that the RTM could serve Mascouche more cheaply, easily, and quickly by using the CP line that leaves the Saint-Jérôme line at St. Martin Junction in Laval, also serving the eastern part of that city.

See also 
 ALP-45DP
 List of Montreal bus routes
 Réseau express métropolitain

References

External links
 RTM - Mascouche line (official website)
Communiqué from the city of Repentigny (In French)
All Aboard for Montreal Nord
Mascouche Line Project Details

Exo commuter rail lines
Transport in Lanaudière
Railway lines opened in 2014
2014 establishments in Quebec